Papoulias (or Papoulia, maiden name) is a Greek surname. It is the surname of:

 Evelina Papoulia (born 1971), Greek actress and dancer
 Georgios Papoulias (1927–2009), Greek politician and diplomat
 Karolos Papoulias (1929–2021), Greek politician and President of Greece
 Panagiotis Papoulias (born 1969), Greek runner

Greek-language surnames
Surnames